Andy Sturgeon (born 1965/1966) is a British landscape and garden designer, author, journalist, broadcaster and commentator in the international garden design sector.

Early life
Before graduating from the Welsh College of Horticulture in 1987, Sturgeon worked at the Royal Horticultural Society Garden Wisley, and as a landscape gardener.

Career
He has been included in lists of the United Kingdom's top ten garden designers by The Sunday Times and House & Garden magazine. He has won numerous awards at the RHS Chelsea Flower Show, including six gold medals and a best in show award. In 2011, Sturgeon was made a Fellow of the UK Society of Garden Designers.

His commissions include large country estates, public spaces and rooftop gardens throughout the United Kingdom. He has worked on projects in Asia, Russia, Europe and the Middle East. Some examples of his works include a show garden that he designed for South Korea's first garden festival - the Suncheon Bay Garden Expo, a garden for Great Ormond Street Hospital and a rooftop garden for Axtell House in Soho.

In 2013, Sturgeon launched Garden Design Asia, a landscape and garden design service to meet the needs of wealthy private clients in Asia.  The company was formed with Jim Fogarty, Ronnie Tan and Stephen Caffyn, and combines the design styles and influences of British, Australian and Asian gardens.

He is a published author, journalist and broadcaster and a commentator in the international garden design sector. He presents the BBC's annual coverage of the RHS Chelsea Flower Show.

He has published several books including Planted, Potted on indoor plants, and most recently Big Plans, Small Gardens.

Personal life
Sturgeon lives in Brighton, and has three sons with his partner Sarah Didinal, who died suddenly in summer 2009, aged 37.

He has travelled extensively to observe gardens and plants in their natural habitats, including a plant hunt in Madagascar and a seed-collecting expedition in Kenya for the Millennium Seed Bank.

Publications

References

External links
Official website

Year of birth missing (living people)
Living people
People from Surrey
English gardeners
English garden writers
1960s births